Twilight on the Rio Grande is a 1947 American Western film directed by Frank McDonald, written by Dorrell McGowan and Stuart E. McGowan, and starring Gene Autry, Sterling Holloway, Adele Mara, Bob Steele, Charles Evans and Martin Garralaga. It was released on April 1, 1947, by Republic Pictures.

Plot
Gene Autry, starring in his own name, visits a Mexican border town with some of his ranch hands, to attend a carnival. Dusty, one of the ranch hands, falls victim to a jewelry smuggling operation and is murdered in the process. Gene soon learns that one of the town’s attorneys, Henry Blackstone, is masterminding the smuggling operation. Gene breaks into Blackstone's office one night looking for evidence, but Blackstone and his men surprise him and then attempt to frame him as a burglar.  Gene is fortunate that the local police are also investigating the smuggling racket and let him go.  After an attempt by Blackstone’s men to kill an insurance investigator who is working with the local police, Gene discovers that Blackstone and his men are trying to smuggle more jewelry into the United States via an ambulance. Gene intercepts the ambulance and kills Blackstone in an ensuing gun fight.

Cast 
Gene Autry as Gene Autry
Sterling Holloway as Pokie
Adele Mara as Elena Del Rio
Bob Steele as Dusty Morgan
Charles Evans as Henry Blackstone
Martin Garralaga as Mucho the Woodchopper
Howard Negley as Jake
George J. Lewis as Captain Gonzáles
Nacho Galindo as Torres
Tex Terry as Henchman Joe
The Cass County Boys as Musicians

Reception
The film was included in the 1978 book, The Fifty Worst Films of All Time (and How They Got That Way), by Harry Medved, Randy Dreyfuss, and Michael Medved.

References

External links 
 

1947 films
Republic Pictures films
American Western (genre) films
1947 Western (genre) films
Films directed by Frank McDonald
American black-and-white films
1940s English-language films
1940s American films